Visa requirements for Uruguayan citizens are administrative entry restrictions by the authorities of other states placed on citizens of Uruguay. As of 19 July 2022, Uruguayan citizens had visa-free or visa on arrival access to 153 countries and territories, ranking the Uruguayan passport 28th in terms of travel freedom according to the Henley Passport Index.

For traveling within South America (except the Guyanas), Uruguayans do not need to use a passport, as they may use their ID card.  Naturalised Uruguayan citizens "legal citizens" are currently facing challenges when travelling internationally as their Uruguayan passport and ID card will show country of birth as "nationality" causing challenges when travelling.

Visa requirements map

Visa requirements
Visa requirements for holders of normal passports traveling for tourist purposes:

Uruguay is a full member of Mercosur. As such, its citizens enjoy unlimited access to any of the other full members (Argentina, Brazil and Paraguay) and associated members (Bolivia, Chile, Colombia, Ecuador and Peru) with the right to residence and work, with no requirement other than nationality. Citizens of these nine countries (including Uruguay) may apply for the grant of "temporary residence" for up to two years in another country of the bloc. Then, they may apply for "permanent residence" just before the term of their "temporary residence" expires.

Territories and disputed areas
Visa requirements for Uruguayan citizens for visits to various territories, disputed areas and restricted zones:

See also

Visa policy of Uruguay
Uruguayan passport

References and Notes
References

Notes

Uruguay
Foreign relations of Uruguay